Chris Wolf (born 23 February 1991) is a German former professional footballer who played as a right-back.

Career
Wolf played most of his career for SpVgg Bayreuth. He retired from football after the club reached promotion to 3. Liga after the 2021–22 season, instead becoming a coach for the side.

References

External links

1991 births
Living people
German footballers
TSV 1860 Munich II players
SV Elversberg players
SpVgg Bayreuth players
3. Liga players
Regionalliga players
Association football defenders
Sportspeople from Bayreuth
Footballers from Bavaria